Néstor Jesús Gordillo Benítez (born 22 August 1989) is a Spanish professional footballer who plays as attacking midfielder for II liga club KKS 1925 Kalisz.

Club career
Born in Las Palmas, Gordillo finished his graduation from the youth academy of CD Tenerife. After making his debut with CD Tenerife C in 2008, he went on to represent lower division clubs namely CD Tenerife B, AD Huracán, CD Azuqueca, UD Las Palmas C, UD Las Palmas Atlético and UD Vecindario.

On 31 January 2014, Gordillo signed for Segunda División B club CD Guijuelo. On 23 March, he scored his first goal for the club in a 3–1 victory over SD Noja. On 28 January 2015, he returned to his former club UD Las Palmas Atlético on a loan deal for the remainder of the season.

On 4 January 2016, Gordillo switched to Tercera División side Atlético Madrid B. In the summer of 2016, a visa problem prevented him from signing for Indian Super League club ATK. He resigned for CD Guijuelo on 19 July. He was released at the end of the season. On 1 September 2017, he moved to fellow league club UE Cornellà.

On 13 June 2018, Gordillo moved abroad for the first time in his career and joined Indian I-League club Chennai City. On 26 October, he made his debut, assisting Pedro Manzi twice in a 4–1 triumph over Indian Arrows. On 1 November, he scored his first goal for the club in a 2–2 draw against Churchill Brothers.

On 1 October 2019, he moved to Hyderabad  FC on a 2 year deal.

On 30 January 2021, Gordillo joined Polish third  division club KKS 1925 Kalisz.

Honours

Club
Chennai City FC
I-League: 2018–19

References

External links

1989 births
Living people
Association football midfielders
Spanish footballers
Segunda División B players
Tercera División players
CD Tenerife B players
CD Azuqueca players
UD Las Palmas C players
UD Las Palmas Atlético players
UD Vecindario players
CD Guijuelo footballers
Atlético Madrid B players
UE Cornellà players
I-League players
Chennai City FC players
Arka Gdynia players
I liga players
II liga players
Spanish expatriate footballers
Expatriate footballers in India
Expatriate footballers in Poland
Spanish expatriate sportspeople in India
Spanish expatriate sportspeople in Poland